Enache Panait (born 6 October 1949) is a Romanian former wrestler who competed in the 1972 Summer Olympics and in the 1976 Summer Olympics.

References

External links
 

1949 births
Living people
Olympic wrestlers of Romania
Wrestlers at the 1972 Summer Olympics
Wrestlers at the 1976 Summer Olympics
Romanian male sport wrestlers